
Lac du Grand Désert is a lake in the canton of Valais, Switzerland. It is located at an elevation of 2642 m, fed by the Grand Désert Glacier.

See also
List of mountain lakes of Switzerland

Lakes of Valais
Glacial lakes